State Highway 27  (SH-27) is a state highway in Idaho, United States, that runs from Oakley to SH-25 in Paul.

Route description
SH-27 begins in the town of Oakley and leaves the center of town on Center Street, heading due north. The highway makes a slight bend to the northeast before continuing north and entering the town of Burley as Overland Avenue. SH-27 intersects U.S. Route 30 (US 30) and runs concurrently with Interstate 84 Business (I-84 Bus.) as it leaves the town, heading north before turning northeast and intersecting I-84, where I-84 Business ends. The road continues north as 600 West Road, where it ends in the town of Paul at SH-25.

Junction list

See also

 List of state highways in Idaho
 List of highways numbered 27

References

External links

027
Transportation in Cassia County, Idaho
Transportation in Minidoka County, Idaho